The Alliance Premier League season of 1985–86 (known as the Gola League 1985–86 for sponsorship reasons) was the seventh season of the Alliance Premier League. This was the first year where a team from the Isthmian League had been promoted to the APL.

New teams in the league this season
 Cheltenham Town (promoted 1984–85)
 Stafford Rangers (promoted 1984–85)
 Wycombe Wanderers (promoted 1984-85)

Final league table

Results

Top scorers
Source:

Promotion and relegation

Promoted

 Gateshead (from the Northern Premier League)
 Sutton (from the Isthmian League)
 Welling United (from the Southern Premier League)

Relegated
 Wycombe Wanderers (to the Isthmian League)
 Dartford (to the Southern Premier League)
 Barrow (to the Northern Premier League)

Election to the Football League
As winners of the Alliance Premier League, Enfield won the right to apply for election to the Football League to replace one of the four bottom sides in the 1985–86 Football League Fourth Division. The vote went as follows:

As a result Enfield did not gain membership of the Football League. This was the final season in which the team who won the Conference National had to apply for election to the Football League, and from the 1986–87 season onward the winning team was automatically promoted, on the provision that they met the various conditions that the Football League set for all its members.

References

External links
 1985–86 Conference National Results
 Re-election Results – The Division Four final league table, including the results of the re-election vote.

National League (English football) seasons
5